The Queensland Railways C15 class locomotive was a class of 2-8-0 steam locomotives operated by the Queensland Railways.

History
In 1879, the Queensland Railway’s Southern & Western Railways took delivery of one Baldwin Locomotive Company 2-8-0 locomotive, being placed in service as no. 41 hauling services up the Main Range.

A similar example as imported jointly by JA Overend and Company and Garget and Company for sections 1 and 2 of the Stanthorpe extension. It was purchased by the Queensland Railways entering service as no. 42. No. 41 was transferred to the Great Northern Railway (Townsville), returning south in 1886 as no. 104. Both were reboilered in 1900. They were similar to the New Zealand Railways T class.

Per Queensland Railway's classification system they were designated the C15 class, the C representing they had four driving axles, and the 15 the cylinder diameter in inches.

Class list

References

Baldwin locomotives
Railway locomotives introduced in 1879
C15
2-8-0 locomotives
3 ft 6 in gauge locomotives of Australia